"Get Over Yourself" is a song recorded by American country music group SHeDAISY.  It was released in March 2002 as the first single from the trio's second studio album Knock on the Sky.  The song reached #27 on the Billboard Hot Country Singles & Tracks chart.  The song was written by Kristyn Osborn and Marcus Hummon.

Chart performance

References

2002 singles
2002 songs
SHeDAISY songs
Songs written by Marcus Hummon
Songs written by Kristyn Osborn
Song recordings produced by Dann Huff
Lyric Street Records singles